Video is an electronic medium for the recording, copying and broadcasting of moving visual images.

Video may also refer to:

Arts and entertainment

Music
 Music video, a short film integrating a song and imagery, produced for promotional or artistic purposes

Albums
 Video (2 Plus 1 album) or the title song, 1985
 Video, by Pakito, 2006
 The Video, a video album by All Saints, 1998
 The Video, a video album by the Sugarcubes, 1991

Songs
  "Video" (song), by India.Arie, 2001
 "Video!", by Jeff Lynne, 1984
 "Video", by Ben Folds Five from Ben Folds Five, 1995
 "Video", by Davido from Omo Baba Olowo, 2012

Other media
 Video (magazine), a 1977–1999 American consumer electronics magazine
 Video art, use of video as an artistic medium
 Video clip, a short segment of video

Technology
Component video, a video signal that has been split into component channels, often referring to a three-channel analogue standard
Composite video, a single-channel video signal
Analog video, video encoded as analog waveforms
Digital video, video encoded as digital data
Home video, video media sold, rented or streamed for home entertainment
HTML5 video, identified by the <Video> tag
List of video connectors
S-Video, add two-channel video signal

See also

Fideo (disambiguation)
VISTA Deep Extragalactic Observations Survey